Dmytro Chuchukalo (born October 5, 1995) is a Ukrainian foil fencer.

He is champion of the 2017 Summer Universiade in men's foil individual competition.

Chuchukalo is a student at the Kyiv National University of Physical Education and Sport of Ukraine.

References

Links 
 Profile at the European Fencing Confederation

Ukrainian male foil fencers
Living people
1995 births
Universiade medalists in fencing
Universiade gold medalists for Ukraine
Medalists at the 2017 Summer Universiade